Mady Goundo Sissoko (born 20 December 2000) is a Malian college basketball player for the Michigan State Spartans of the Big Ten Conference. At the high school level, Sissoko competed for Wasatch Academy in Mount Pleasant, Utah and was a consensus four-star recruit.

Early life
Sissoko was born in Bafoulabé, a rural commune in Mali, where he grew up without electricity, running water, cars or radios. He worked by hand on his family's farm, as his village did not have modern farming equipment. At age 15, Sissoko's basketball potential drew the attention of Michael Clayton, administrator of the Utah Valley Eye Center, who was making an annual trip to Africa with doctors performing free cataract surgeries on villagers. Sissoko's brother, a member of the doctors' armed security personnel, had asked Clayton about the possibility of Sissoko attending school and playing basketball in the United States. After being impressed by his height and athleticism, Clayton recommended Sissoko to his friend, a coach at Wasatch Academy in Mount Pleasant, Utah, before helping him move there to play basketball.

High school career
As a freshman at Wasatch Academy, Sissoko spoke little English and had a limited knowledge of basketball and received limited playing time. After the season, he quickly improved his game with the Utah Mountain Stars Amateur Athletic Union program. Sissoko became a rotation player in his sophomore season and entered the starting lineup as a junior. In his junior season, he averaged 12.5 points and 8.9 rebounds per game. Before his senior year, Sissoko broke his right hand in an all-terrain vehicle accident during an official recruiting visit to Brigham Young University. The injury delayed the start of his senior season. As a senior, he averaged 12.2 points and 6.7 rebounds per game for one of the best high school teams in the country, helping the team to a 27–2 record. Sissoko's senior season was ended prematurely due to the coronavirus pandemic. He was named co-winner of the Heart Award for the Iverson Classic, which was not played because of the pandemic.

Recruiting
Sissoko was a consensus four-star recruit and one of the best centers in the 2020 class. He was ranked the No. 42 player and No. 8 center in his class by 247Sports. On 10 September 2019, he committed to play college basketball for Michigan State.

College career
Sissoko played a limited role as a freshman at Michigan State, averaging 1.1 points and 1.8 rebounds per game.

Career statistics

College

|-
| style="text-align:left;"| 2020–21
| style="text-align:left;"| Michigan State
| 25 || 0 || 5.4 || .588 || – || .438 || 1.8 || .0 || .0 || .4 || 1.1

Personal life
Sissoko is the son of Kassim Sissoko and Fatoumata Kanouté. He has six sisters and three brothers. Michael Clayton, who facilitated his move to the United States, serves as his legal guardian.

References

External links
Michigan State Spartans bio
Wasatch Academy Tigers bio

Living people
2000 births
Malian men's basketball players
Centers (basketball)
Malian expatriate sportspeople in the United States
Malian Muslims
People from Kayes Region
21st-century Malian people